Abzakovo (Abźaq) is a rural locality (a village) in Mukasovsky Selsoviet, Baymaksky District, Bashkortostan, Russia. The population was 144 as of 2010. There are 3 streets.

Geography 
Abzakovo is located 60 km northeast of Baymak (the district's administrative centre) by road. Akhmerovo is the nearest rural locality.

Ethnicity 
The village is inhabited by Bashkirs.

References 

Rural localities in Baymaksky District